Italian Ice is the fifth studio album by American singer-songwriter Nicole Atkins. It was released on May 29, 2020 under Single Lock Records.

The album features collaborations by Binky Griptite, Britt Daniel, David Hood, McKenzie Smith and Jim Sclavunos.

Critical reception
Italian Ice was met with generally favorable reviews from critics. At Metacritic, which assigns a weighted average rating out of 100 to reviews from mainstream publications, this release received an average score of 78, based on 8 reviews.

Track listing

References

2020 albums
Single Lock Records albums